The Neah-Kah-Nie School District is located in north Tillamook County, Oregon, United States.  There are four schools in the district: Neah-Kah-Nie High School, Neah-Kah-Nie Middle School, Garibaldi Grade School, and Nehalem Elementary School.

It includes the cities of Manzanita, Nehalem, Wheeler, Rockaway Beach, Garibaldi, and Bay City.

Demographics
In the 2009 school year, the district had 58 students classified as homeless by the Department of Education, or 8.3% of students in the district.

References

External links
Neah-Kah-Nie School District 56

School districts in Oregon